Handball competition of the 2022 Bolivarian Games was held from 25 June to 4 July at the Concha Acústica, Chía, Cundinamarca Department.

Participating teams

Men

Women

Medalists

Men's tournament

All times are local (UTC−5).

Women's tournament

Preliminary round

Group A

All times are local (UTC−05:00).

Group B

Final round

Fifth place game

Bronze medal game

Gold medal game

Final standings

Also read
Handball at the Bolivarian Games

References

External links
website of the 2022 Bolivarian Games

Handball
Bolivarian Games
2022 Bolivarian Games
2022 Bolivarian Games